Thomas Hughes  (20 October 182222 March 1896) was an English lawyer, judge, politician and author. He is most famous for his novel Tom Brown's School Days (1857), a semi-autobiographical work set at Rugby School, which Hughes had attended. It had a lesser-known sequel, Tom Brown at Oxford (1861).

Hughes had numerous other interests, in particular as a Member of Parliament, in the British co-operative movement, and in a settlement—Rugby, Tennessee, USA—reflecting his values.

Early life 
Hughes was the second son of John Hughes, editor of the Boscobel Tracts (1830), and was born in Uffington, Berkshire (now Oxfordshire). He had six brothers, and one sister, Jane Senior, who later became Britain's first female civil servant.  At the age of eight he was sent to Twyford School, a preparatory public school near Winchester, where he remained until the age of eleven. In February 1834 he went to Rugby School, which was then under the celebrated Thomas Arnold, a contemporary of his father at Oriel College, Oxford.

Hughes excelled at sports rather than in scholarship, and his school career culminated in a cricket match at Lord's Cricket Ground. In 1842 he went on to Oriel College, and graduated BA in 1845. At Oxford, he played cricket for the university team in the annual University Match against Cambridge University, also at Lord's, and a match still regarded as first-class cricket.

Legal career
Hughes was called to the bar in 1848, became Queen's Counsel in 1869 and a bencher in 1870. He was appointed to a county court judgeship in the Chester district in July 1882.

Social interests
A committed social reformer, Hughes became involved in the Christian socialism movement led by Frederick Maurice, which he joined in 1848. In January 1854 he was one of the founders of the Working Men's College in Great Ormond Street, and was the college's principal from 1872 to 1883.

Hughes gave evidence in 1850 to a House of Commons committee on savings. In so doing he participated in a Christian Socialist initiative, which led shortly to the Industrial and Provident Societies Partnership Act 1852, and the emergence of the industrial and provident society. The Act was the work of Robert Aglionby Slaney, with whom Hughes worked in alliance.

Hughes was involved also in the formation of some early trade unions, and helped finance the printing of Liberal publications; and acted as the first President of the Co-operative Congress in 1869, serving on the Co-operative Central Board. He invested with William Romaine Callender in co-operative mills, in 1866.

In politics

Hughes was elected to Parliament as a Liberal for Lambeth (1865–68), and for Frome (1868–74). The context for the end of his political career was the unpopularity with Hughes's Frome constituents of his support for the Elementary Education Act 1870.

As an MP Hughes worked on trade union legislation, but was not in a position to have major changes passed. He had greater success in improving the legal position of co-operatives, which in particular became able to operate as a limited company. The issue of legal obstacles to the operation of labour unions was topical, and in 1867 Hughes was made a member of a Royal Commission set up to consider the matter. Initially he was the only one on the committee sympathetic to the union point of view; after some lobbying he was joined by Frederic Harrison, and a concession was made to union representatives, allowing them observer places in the proceedings. Hughes then worked with Harrison and Robert Applegarth to diminish the effect of some of the testimony from employers.

The outcome of this commission was that Harrison, Hughes and Lord Lichfield produced a minority report (1869), recommending that all the legal restrictions should be dropped. Then the matter was raised again in a second Commission, at the end of Hughes's time in Parliament. At that point Alexander Macdonald used a minority report to refer back to Hughes's earlier view; but Hughes signed the majority report. It advocated amendment of the Master and Servant Act 1867, but little substantive change to the Criminal Law Amendment Act 1871 and the law of conspiracy.

Later life
In 1878–9 Hughes began writing The Manual for Co-operators (1881), with Vansittart Neale, for the Co-operative Congress. As a side-product he developed an interest in the model village. In 1880, he acquired the ownership of Franklin W. Smith's Plateau City and founded a settlement in America—Rugby, Tennessee—which was designed as an experiment in utopian living for the younger sons of the English gentry. It followed closely on the failed colony Buckthorn (existing about 1872 to 1879), established by another Englishman, Charles Lempriere, in western Virginia; this settlement had supposedly been suggested by Hughes. Rugby was also unsuccessful on its own terms, but it still exists and is listed on the U.S. National Register of Historic Places.

Hughes was also a prominent figure in the anti-opium movement, and a member of the Society for the Suppression of the Opium Trade.

At the end of the 1880s Hughes clashed with John Thomas Whitehead Mitchell of the Co-operative Wholesale Society, over the vertical integration Mitchell favoured for the Society. Hughes died in 1896 aged 73, at Brighton, of heart failure, and was buried there.

Works
While living at Wimbledon, Hughes wrote his famous story Tom Brown's School Days, which was published in April 1857. He is associated with the novelists of the "muscular school", a loose classification but centred on the fiction of the Crimean War period. Although Hughes had never been a member of the sixth form at Rugby, his impressions of the headmaster Thomas Arnold were reverent.

Hughes also wrote The Scouring of the White Horse (1859), Tom Brown at Oxford (1861), Religio Laici (1868), Life of Alfred the Great (1869) and the Memoir of a Brother. His brother, George Hughes, was the model for the Tom Brown character.

Family
In 1847, Hughes married Frances Ford, daughter of Rev. James Ford, and niece of Richard Ford, and they settled in 1853 at Wimbledon. Their house there was built by the North London Working Builders' Association, a Christian Socialist co-operative; and was shared with J. M. F. Ludlow and his family; Ludlow already shared barristers' chambers with Hughes, and the arrangement lasted four years. There were five sons (Maurice, James, George, John, and Arthur) and four daughters (Lilian, Evie, Caroline and Mary) of the marriage.

Lilian Hughes perished in the sinking of the RMS Titanic in 1912. The youngest child Mary Hughes was a well known Poor Law guardian and volunteer visitor to the local Poor Law infirmary and children's home.

Legacy

A Hughes Scholarship was founded at Oriel College, Oxford. It was a closed award, open only to members, or sons of members, of some Co-operative Societies, in which aspect the award reflected Hughes's involvement with the Co-operative Movement. The first scholar was elected to Oriel in 1884. It was later combined with an award honouring the social reformer Edward Vansittart Neale.

A statue of Hughes (pictured above right) stands outside Rugby School Library: the sculptor was Thomas Brock, and the statue was unveiled in 1899.

Bibliography

Fiction 
Tom Brown's School Days (1857)
The Scouring of The White Horse (1859)
Tom Brown at Oxford (1861)

Non-fiction 
Religio Laici (1861)
A Layman's Faith (1868)
Alfred the Great (1870). In the Sunday Library for Household Reading, this was a largely political work, and was history verging on fiction.
Memoir of a Brother (1873)
The Old Church; What Shall We Do With It? (1878)
The Manliness of Christ (1879)
True Manliness (1880)
Rugby Tennessee (1881)
Memoir of Daniel Macmillan (1882)
G.T.T. Gone to Texas (1884)
Notes for Boys (1885)
Life and Times of Peter Cooper (1886)
James Fraser Second Bishop of Manchester (1887)
David Livingstone (1889)
Vacation Rambles (1895)
Early Memories for the Children (1899)

References 

This entry incorporates some public-domain text originally from the 1911 Encyclopædia Britannica but has been heavily edited.
 The Aftermath with Autobiography of the Author (John Bedford Leno published by Reeves & Turner, London, 1892)

Further reading 
 Briggs, Asa. "Thomas Hughes and the Public Schools": in Briggs, Victorian People (1955) pp. 140–167. online

External links 

 
 
 
 
  Historic Rugby, Tennessee
 Thomas Hughes correspondence collection is held at The National Co-operative Archive, Manchester.
 Details of Hughes family

1822 births
1896 deaths
19th-century English novelists
Alumni of Oriel College, Oxford
Anglican writers
English Christian socialists
English cricketers
English male novelists
British children's writers
Liberal Party (UK) MPs for English constituencies
UK MPs 1865–1868
UK MPs 1868–1874
Oxford University cricketers
People educated at Rugby School
People educated at Twyford School
People from Vale of White Horse (district)
People from Wimbledon, London
Presidents of Co-operative Congress
Anglican socialists
English King's Counsel
English trade unionists
Victorian novelists